Eastview is an unincorporated community in Hardin County, Kentucky, United States.

Geography
The community is also located near the Wendell H. Ford Western Kentucky Parkway at its Exit 124 interchange.

References

Unincorporated communities in Hardin County, Kentucky
Unincorporated communities in Kentucky